Final Five may refer to:

 Cylon (Battlestar Galactica)#Final Five, a group of humanoid Cylons in the 2004 television series Battlestar Galactica 
 Final Five (gymnastics), the US women's gymnastics team at the 2016 Summer Olympics
 Final Five Voting, a five-candidate variant of the Top-four primary